John Charles Cutler (June 29, 1915 – February 8, 2003) was a senior surgeon, and the acting chief of the venereal disease program in the United States Public Health Service. After his death, his involvement in several controversial and unethical medical studies of syphilis was revealed, including the Guatemala and the Tuskegee syphilis experiments.

Early life and education

Cutler was born on June 29, 1915, in Cleveland, Ohio, to Grace Amanda Allen and Glenn Allen Cutler.

He graduated from Western Reserve University Medical School in 1941, and joined the Public Health Service in 1942. In 1943 he worked as a medical officer in the U.S. Public Health Venereal Disease Research Laboratory on Staten Island.

Bioethics violations
Cutler oversaw the Terre Haute prison experiments in 1943 and 1944, in which inmates at a federal penitentiary agreed to be injected with strains of gonorrhea in return for $100, a certificate of merit, and a letter of commendation to the parole board. The experiments were discontinued when Cutler's supervisor determined that the method of inducing gonorrhea in humans was unreliable and could not provide meaningful tests of prophylactic agents.

Cutler then resumed these experiments, conducted by the United States Public Health Service with funding from the United States National Institutes of Health (NIH), as part of the syphilis experiments in Guatemala beginning in 1946, during which doctors deliberately infected an estimated 1500 to 5000 Guatemalans with syphilis without the informed consent of the subjects. Unwitting subjects of the experiments included orphans as young as nine, as well as soldiers, prisoners and mental patients.

Approximately half of those infected as part of the study were treated for the diseases they contracted. A total of 83 subjects died, though the exact relationship to the experiment remains undocumented. This study not only violated the Hippocratic Oath but it echoed Nazi crimes exposed around the same time at the Nuremberg trials.

In 1954, Cutler was in charge of experiments at Sing Sing prison to determine whether a vaccine made from the killed syphilis bacterium would protect prisoners against infection when he later exposed them to the bacterium. Those infected were later treated with penicillin.

Cutler became assistant surgeon general in 1958.

In the 1960s until November 1972, Cutler was involved in the ongoing Tuskegee syphilis experiment, during which several hundred African-American men who had contracted syphilis were observed, but left untreated.

In “The Deadly Deception”, the 1993 Nova documentary about the Tuskegee experiments, Cutler states, “It was important that they were supposedly untreated, and it would be undesirable to go ahead and use large amounts of penicillin to treat the disease, because you’d interfere with the study.”

In 1967 Cutler was appointed Professor of International Health at the University of Pittsburgh, where he also served as chairman of the Department of Health Administration and acting dean of the Graduate School of Public Health in 1968–1969. He died on February 8, 2003, at Western Pennsylvania Hospital in Pittsburgh. The university started a lecture series in his name after his death, but discontinued it in 2008 when his role in the Tuskegee experiment came to the attention of a new dean.

See also
List of medical ethics cases

References

1915 births
2003 deaths
University of Pittsburgh faculty
United States Public Health Service personnel
Physicians from Cleveland
Case Western Reserve University alumni
Human subject research in the United States
Medical ethics